The 2001 Women's World Snooker Championship was a women's snooker tournament that took place in April 2001, with early rounds held at Jester's Snooker Club in Swindon, and the semi-finals and final played at the Crucible Theatre in Sheffield, England. The event was the 2001 edition of the World Women's Snooker Championship, first held in 1976. It was won by England's Lisa Quick, who defeated Scot Lynette Horsburgh 4–2 in the final. The defending champion and top-ranked women's player Kelly Fisher lost 3–4 to Sharon Dickson in the last 16. Fisher, who had won the world championship in each of the three preceding years, made the only  break of the competition, a 119 in her match against Nicola Barker. 

Quick, ranked fifth, had previously won only one ranking tournament, the 1999 Regal Welsh, and it was the first time that Horsburgh, ranked second, had reached the world championship final in 16 attempts. It was level at 1–1 after the first two .

Quick had won the women's 1999 WEPF World Eight-ball championship in blackball and with this victory became the first person in either the women's or the men's game to win world titles in both pool and snooker. She went on to win the WEPF World Eight-ball again in June 2001, to become the first person to hold pool and snooker world titles concurrently. The competition was sponsored by cigarette company Embassy and attracted entrants from fourteen countries including Australia, Belgium, Brazil, England, France, India, Ireland, Japan, Scotland, Singapore, and Wales. The winner of the event won a prize of £5,000.

Prize fund
Below is the prize money awarded at the event.

Winner: £5,000
Runner-up: £2,500
Losing semi-finalists: £1,100
Losing quarter-finalists: £600
Last 16 losers: £200
Last 32 losers: £100
Highest break: £270

Main draw

References 

2001 in English sport
2001 in snooker
2001 in women's sport
2000s in Sheffield
2000s in Wiltshire
April 2001 sports events in the United Kingdom
International sports competitions hosted by England
Sport in Swindon
Sports competitions in Sheffield
2001